Lithocarpus kostermansii is a species of plant in the family Fagaceae. It is a tree endemic to Java in Indonesia. It is an endangered species threatened by habitat loss.

References

kostermani
Endemic flora of Java
Trees of Java
Endangered flora of Asia
Taxonomy articles created by Polbot